The Punakaiki River is a river of the West Coast Region of New Zealand's South Island. It flows predominantly northwest from its sources in the Paparoa Range, reaching the Tasman Sea two kilometres south of the town of Punakaiki. Most of the river's length is within Paparoa National Park.

The Inland Pack Track and the Paparoa Track both commence from the south bank of the river at Waipori Road, where there is a suspension bridge across the river. The section of the trail from the Punakaiki River to the Pororari River is dual-use – shared between walkers and mountain bikers, and serves as the northern entry or exit point of the Paparoa Track.

See also
List of rivers of New Zealand

References

External links

 Punakaiki River at NZ Gazeteer

Rivers of the West Coast, New Zealand
Rivers of New Zealand
Paparoa National Park